Qala'at Tarablus in Arabic, is an ancient citadel and fort on a hilltop in Tripoli, Lebanon. Once known as The Citadel of Raymond de Saint-Gilles or Qala'at Sanjil and also as Mons Peregrinus ("Pilgrim's Mountain"), it takes its name from Raymond of Saint-Gilles, a Crusader commander who was a key player in its enlargement. It is a common misconception that he was responsible for its construction when in 1103 he laid siege to the city. In fact in the early 19th century, the citadel was extensively restored and rebuilt by the Ottoman governor of Tripoli Mustafa Agha Barbar and in consequence very little of the original Crusader structure has survived until this day.

History
The citadel of Tripoli was enlarged by Raymond of Saint-Gilles, governor of Tripoli, in 1103 on the emplacement of the castle of Saint-Gilles. When the Mont Pèlerin quarter was set ablaze by the Mamluks after the reconquest, the castle of Saint-Gilles suffered from the holocaust and stood abandoned on the hilltop for the next eighteen years. It was essential to have an adequate stronghold in Tripoli for the sultan’s troops, temporarily garrisoned in Hisn al-Akrád (Krak des Chevaliers), as the distance was too great in case of enemy attack. The governor therefore chose the emplacement of the gutted Crusader castle on the hill, incorporating what he could in his citadel, and made use of Roman column shafts and other building material he found nearby. Many of the interior walls, ramps and terraces of the citadel seen today were built in his time.

Abou’l Fidá and Ibn al-Wardi record that, among the important events which took place in the year A.H 746 (1345), was the promulgation of a military decree which was set up by order of the Mamluk Sultan al-Kamil Sha'ban in the citadels of Aleppo, Tripoli, Hisn al-Akrâd and other fortified places. The decree, put over the second entrance way of the citadel of Tripoli, is by far the best preserved. Apparently this sultan, who lived a life of luxury and debauch, was in constant need of extra revenues. In order to fill his depleted treasury, he imposed a heavy registration tax upon all feudal land concessions and appropriations. This tax was unpopular and was obviously going to stir up discontent among his subjects. To forestall any uprising and gain the support of his troops, upon whom his power was based he issued this military decree. It was the custom that a Mamluk soldier, under contract for a specified number of years, received an annual gratuity which amounted to slightly over eleven days extra pay. If the soldier died before the end of his contract, the sultan had the right to claim the extra sum of money which had accumulated during the soldier's years of service. Sha'bán abandoned his rights to this claim, once and for all, hoping thus to enlist the support of his troops.

In 1516, Syria and Egypt fell to the Ottoman Sultan Selim I. His son and successor Suleiman I, called the Magnificent (1520-1566), soon after his accession made an inspection tour of his newly conquered lands. He gathered about him in Damascus all his provincial governors and on this occasion took the decision to rebuild the great citadel of Tripoli. Over the entrance portal, the sultan commemorated this important restoration work with an inscription: "In the name of Allah, it has been decreed by the royal sultan’s order, al Malik al-Muzuffar Sultan Suleiman Shah, son of Sultan Selim Shah, may his orders never cease to be obeyed by the emirs, that this blessed citadel be restored so as to be a fortified stronghold for all time. Its construction was completed in the blessed month of Sha’bân of the year 927 (July 1521)

In the years that followed, various Ottoman governors of Tripoli did restoration work on the citadel to suit their needs and with time the medieval crenelated battlements were destroyed in order to open sally ports for cannons. In the early 19th century, the citadel was extensively restored by the Ottoman governor of Tripoli Mustafa Agha Barbar. Very little of the original Crusader structure has survived until this day. The graves of a number of nameless Frankish knights, here and there, are the only bits of evidence today evocative of their presence on the heights of Tripoli's "Pilgrim's Mountain" many centuries ago.

The Northern Lebanon & Akkar Museum
The citadel houses the Northern Lebanon & Akkar Museum. The small museum has a noteworthy numismatic collection covering most periods from Hellenics to Ayyubids.

See also

Architecture of Lebanon

References

External links
 Lonely Planet
 Compare to Citadel of Tripoli

Archaeological museums in Lebanon
Museums of Ancient Near East in Lebanon
Tripoli, Lebanon
1102 establishments in Asia
Ottoman architecture in Lebanon
Crusader castles
Castles in Lebanon
Tourist attractions in Lebanon
Tourism in Lebanon